The 2023 Bhutanese national assembly election is scheduled to be held in 2023.

Electoral system
The 47 members of the National Assembly are elected from single-member constituencies. Primary elections are held in which voters cast votes for parties. The top two parties are then able to field candidates in the main round of voting, in which members are elected using first-past-the-post voting.

References

Bhutan
National Assembly elections in Bhutan